Teinobasis rufithorax is a species of damselfly in the family Coenagrionidae,
commonly known as a red-breasted longtail. 
It is found on Cape York Peninsula, in Queensland, Australia, and on Torres Strait islands, Maluku Island, Aru Islands, New Guinea, Bismarck Archipelago and  the Solomon Islands. 
It inhabits shaded, deep waters.

Teinobasis rufithorax is a medium-sized damselfly, with an orange body and an orange-red tip to its tail.

Gallery

See also
 List of Odonata species of Australia

References 

Coenagrionidae
Odonata of Australia
Odonata of Oceania
Odonata of Asia
Insects of New Guinea
Insects of Indonesia
Insects of Southeast Asia
Insects of Australia
Taxa named by Edmond de Sélys Longchamps
Insects described in 1877
Damselflies